DeMarcus Deon Corley (born June 3, 1974) is an American professional boxer. A veteran of the sport for more than two decades, he held the WBO junior welterweight title from 2001 to 2003, and has fought as a gatekeeper against many of boxing's biggest names.

Amateur career
Corley was an amateur standout, and won the National Golden Gloves Light Welterweight Championship in 1995. Corley also had a record of 100-19.

Professional career
Corley began boxing professionally on May 17, 1996, knocking out Aaron Smith in the first round.

WBO light welterweight champion
Corley would not lose a match until 1999, against Daniel Lujan. Later that year in his 22nd bout with a record of 21 wins 1 defeat (11KO), he faced Ener Julio for the USBA light welterweight title. He won via a 12-round split decision. Corley later defeated Ener Julio again to defend his WBO light welterweight belt (which he would later lose to future undisputed welterweight champion Zab Judah).

Inactive period and return
Corley took 2002 off from boxing to recover from the murder of his brother. He returned to the ring on January 4, 2003.

In 2006 Corley fought Junior Witter for the vacant WBC light welterweight championship, losing a wide decision in a very tactical bout.

Later career
After many consecutive losses, Corley took on Damian Fuller in 2010 and improved his record to 37-13-1 (21 KOs) with a 4th-round TKO.

On August 28, 2010, Corley lost to Marcos Maidana by unanimous decision in a fight in which was disputed, for the WBA light welterweight title.

On November 14, 2010, Corley lost to Serhiy Fedchenko by unanimous decision in a fight in which was also disputed, for the vacant WBO European light welterweight title.

On January 21, 2012, Corley won the vacant NABF light welterweight title when he defeated Gabriel Bracero by unanimous decision.

Corley then earned a TKO victory over Paul McCloskey on May 5, 2012.

On September 27, 2013, Corley lost against Selçuk Aydın by corner stoppage at the end of round 4.

Bare knuckle boxing
On March 19, 2021, Corley fought Reggie Barnett Jr in Bare Knuckle Fighting Championship. He lost the fight via retirement after the fourth round.

Professional boxing record

Bare Knuckle Boxing Record

|-
|Loss
|align=center|0–1
|Reggie Barnett Jr.		
|TKO (retirement)
|Bare Knuckle FC 16
|
|align=center|4
|align=center|2:00
|Biloxi, Mississippi, United States 
|
|-

References

External links

1974 births
Boxers from Washington, D.C.
Living people
Southpaw boxers
World Boxing Organization champions
American male boxers
World light-welterweight boxing champions
Lightweight boxers
Light-welterweight boxers
Welterweight boxers